Vicia lutea (yellow vetch, smooth yellow vetch) is a species of flowering plant in the bean family Fabaceae.

Distribution 
It is native to Europe, western Asia, and North Africa, and it is known on other continents as an introduced species.

Description  
It is an annual herb. It has leaves made up of several pairs of oblong or linear leaflets each 1 to 2 centimeters long. It produces solitary flowers or clusters of up to 3 flowers with yellow or purple-tinged corollas up to 3 centimeters in length.

References

Jepson Manual Treatment
USDA Plants Profile

External links
Photo gallery

lutea
Flora of Europe
Flora of North Africa
Flora of Western Asia
Plants described in 1753
Taxa named by Carl Linnaeus